Pieta is a 1987 Australian television film about a woman who commits murder. It was also known as Shadowplay.

References

External links
Pieta at IMDb
Pieta at Peter Malone

Australian television films
1980s English-language films
1988 films
1988 television films
1980s Australian films